Grannus (also Granus, Mogounus, and Amarcolitanus) was a Celtic deity of classical antiquity. He was regularly identified with Apollo as Apollo Grannus and frequently worshipped in conjunction with Sirona, and sometimes with Mars and other deities.

Name

Etymology
The theonym Grannus is a latinized form of Gaulish Grannos. The same stem appears in the personal names Grania, Grannia, Grannicus, and Grannica, as well as in the place names Grignols (from an earlier *Granno-ialon 'Grannus' clearing'), Aquae Granni (> Aachen), and Granéjouls.

Its etymology remains debated. The name could be connected to Proto-Celtic *grand-/grend-, meaning 'beard' (cf. Middle Irish grend, Middle Welsh grann 'chin, beard, cheek', Middle Breton grann 'eyebrow'), although some scholars have pointed that the god is never actually portrayed with a beard. Old French grenon ('small beard'), Old Spanish greñon ('beard') and Occitan gren ('moustache') are derived from an earlier *grennos, that is supposed to be Gaulish, but the vocalism is difficult to reconcile with the other forms.

An alternative etymology connects the name to a reconstructed form *gra-snó- (< *gwhr-snó-), which could be related to Proto-Celtic *gwrīns-/gwrens-, meaning 'heat' (cf. Middle Irish grīs 'heat, glow, embers', Middle Welsh gwres 'heat [of the sun, fire], passion, lust'). Scholar Jürgen Zeidler contends that this would be a "probable reference to the sun's heat and its healing properties". In early twentieth century scholarship, the theonym was often compared with the Old Irish grían ('sun'), which, according to linguist Ranko Matasović, should be derived from Proto-Celtic *gwrensā (> Primitive Irish *gwrēnā).

Epithets
At Monthelon, Grannus is called Deus Apollo Grannus Amarcolitanus ("The one with a piercing or far-reaching look"), and at Horbourg-Wihr Apollo Grannus Mogounus.

In all of his centres of worship where he is assimilated to a Roman god, Grannus was identified with Apollo, presumably in Apollo's role as a healing or solar deity. In Trier, he is identified more specifically with Phoebus as Apollo Grannus Phoebus.

Centres of worship

One of the god's most famous cult centres was at Aquae Granni (now Aachen, Germany). Aachen means ‘water’ in Old High German, a calque of the Roman name of "Aquae Granni". The town's hot springs with temperatures between 45 °C and 75 °C lay in the somewhat inhospitably marshy area around Aachen's basin-shaped valley region. Aachen first became a curative centre in Hallstatt times.

According to Cassius Dio, the Roman Emperor Caracalla (188 AD to 217 AD) unsuccessfully sought help from Apollo Grannus—as well as Aesculapius and Serapis—during a bout of physical and mental illness, visiting the god's shrine and making many votive offerings; Dio claims that the gods refused to heal him because they knew Caracalla's intentions to be evil. Caracalla's visit to the shrine of ‘the Celtic healing-god’ Grannus was during the war with Germany in 213.

Festival
A 1st century AD Latin inscription from a public fountain in Limoges mentions a Gaulish ten-night festival of Grannus (lightly Latinized as decamnoctiacis Granni):

(edit)

Translation: "The vergobretus Postumus son of Dumnorix gave from his own money the Aqua Martia ("Water of Martius [or Mars]", an aqueduct) for the ten-night festival of Grannus".

Divine entourage
The name Grannus is sometimes accompanied by those of other deities in the inscriptions. In Augsburg, he is found with both Diana and Sirona; he is again invoked with Sirona at Rome, Bitburg, Baumberg, Lauingen, and Sarmizegetusa (twice). At Ennetach he is with Nymphs, at Faimingen with Hygieia and the Mother of the Gods, and at Grand with Sol. A votive altar at Astorga invokes him after "holy Serapis" and "the many-named Isis", and before "the unvanquished Core and Mars Sagatus".

References

Bibliography

Further reading
 Hofeneder, Andreas; Hainzmann, Manfred, and Mathieu, Nicolas. “Apollon Grannos – Überlegungen Zu Cassius Dio 77, 15,5–7”. In: Théonymie Celtique, Cultes, Interpretatio - Keltische Theonymie, Kulte, Interpretatio. Edited by Andreas Hofeneder and Patrizia de Bernardo Stempel, 1st ed. Austrian Academy of Sciences Press, 2013. pp. 101-112. http://www.jstor.org/stable/j.ctv8mdn28.10.

External links

Celtic gods
Health gods
Solar gods
Fire gods
Water gods
Gods of the ancient Britons